This glossary of geography terms is a list of definitions of terms and concepts used in geography and related fields, including Earth science, oceanography, cartography, and human geography, as well as those describing spatial dimension, topographical features, natural resources, and the collection, analysis, and visualization of geographic data. Related terms may be found in glossary of geology, glossary of agriculture, glossary of environmental science, and glossary of astronomy.

A

B

C

D

E

F

G

H

I

J

K

L

M

N

O

P

Q

R

S

T

U

V

W

Y

Z

See also

 Index of geography articles
 Outline of geography

Notes
Much of this material was copied from U.S. government works which are in the public domain because they are not eligible for copyright protection.

References

Geography-related lists
 
Geography terms
Wikipedia glossaries using description lists